The Doyang is the longest and largest river in the Indian state of Nagaland. With its origin from small streams near the Nagaland–Manipur border, it first flows to the form the River Dzüü and Sidzü which flows in a parallel direction in Kohima District and Phek District to meet at the Zünheboto District. It then flows to Wokha District where it is known by its name, the Doyang and moves south west direction and then north in Assam to join the Dhansiri River which together in turn is a left tributary of the Brahmaputra River.

Dams 

The Doyang Hydro Electric Project is the only major river dam in Nagaland. It was commissioned in the year 2000 and the total installed capacity of the project is 75 (3 X 25) MW.

See also 
 List of rivers in Nagaland

References

External links 

 
Rivers of India
Geography of Nagaland
Rivers of Nagaland